Welbury is a village and civil parish in the Hambleton district of North Yorkshire, England.

The village is mentioned in the Domesday book (1086) as having 6 Geld units for taxable purposes and King William being the Lord. The village was originally in the Union of Northallerton which was in the Wapentake of Birdforth. In 1319, the village and fields were destroyed by marauding Scots on their way to meet the English at what would become the Battle of Myton.

Since about 1800, the manor of Welbury has been held by the Earl of Harewood.

St Leonard Church is 9th century and had renovations in 1815 and 1877. It is in the parish of Welbury in the Diocese of York.

Welbury used to have its own railway station just south of the village built by the Leeds and Thirsk Railway (later the Leeds Northern Railway) which later became part of the North Eastern Railway. The station opened in 1852 and closed to passengers in 1954. The line is still open and is served by Trans-Pennine expresses between Middlesbrough and Manchester Airport via York and Leeds.

Welbury has a village pub, The Duke of Wellington, which gives its land over to the welly wanging championships.

People
Lydia Irving, prison reformer, was born here in 1797

References

External links

Villages in North Yorkshire
Civil parishes in North Yorkshire